Thomas Henry McLemore  was an American politician who served as a Socialist member of the Oklahoma House of Representatives representing Beckham County between 1914 and 1916. He was one of the first third party candidates elected to the Oklahoma House of Representatives alongside fellow Socialist Party Representatives David C. Kirkpatrick, N. D. Pritchett, Charles Henry Ingham, and Sydney W. Hill.

Political career
McLemore was elected to the Oklahoma House of Representatives as a Socialist in 1914. After McLemore lost re-election in 1916, he was the Socialist nominee for president of the Oklahoma Board of Agriculture in 1918. He later joined the Farmer-Labor Party and was their nominee for a Oklahoma Senate district in 1924, before registering as a Democrat in 1928. After switching to the Democratic Party, he ran for his old legislative seat in 1928, 1930, 1934, and 1938. He also ran an unsuccessful race for Congress in 1932 as an independent.

Later years and death
McLemore later wrote a book on the Great Depression. He died in Beckham County in June 28, 1947 and is buried in Fairlawn Cemetery in Elk City.

References

20th-century American politicians
20th-century Members of the Oklahoma House of Representatives
Oklahoma Democrats
Oklahoma Independents
Oklahoma Farmer–Laborites
Socialist Party members of the Oklahoma House of Representatives
Year of birth missing
1947 deaths